Mark Richard Knudson (born October 28, 1960) is an American former right-handed professional baseball pitcher. He played all or part of eight seasons in Major League Baseball (MLB), between 1985 and 1993, primarily for the Milwaukee Brewers.

Professional career

Houston Astros 
Knudson was drafted by the Houston Astros in the third round of the 1982 amateur draft out of Colorado State University. He made his debut with the club on July 8, 1985, and took a 7–4 loss to the Philadelphia Phillies. He won his first major league game on July 10 of the following season, also against the Phillies. On August 15, 1986, he and fellow pitcher Don August were traded to the Milwaukee Brewers for pitcher Danny Darwin.

Milwaukee Brewers 
Knudson pitched as both a starter and long reliever for Milwaukee over the next five seasons, and in 1989 compiled an 8–5 record with a 3.35 ERA. In 1990, he earned a career-best 10 wins.

After starting and gaining the victory on Opening Day 1991 against the Texas Rangers, Knudson contracted a virus that seriously affected his performance. He came down with a 103-degree fever and lost 10 pounds. He missed most of that season and was sent to Triple-A Denver to finish the year, where he helped the Zephyrs win the American Association championship. He was designated for assignment at the end of the year; when he refused, the club released him outright.

Colorado Rockies 
Knudson spent the 1992 season in the San Diego Padres organization before signing with the expansion Colorado Rockies in 1993. He only pitched briefly for the team, however. After struggling and posting a 22.24 ERA in just four appearances, he permanently retired from the game.

Personal life 
One week after he officially retired, Knudson's wife gave birth to triplets. A native of Denver, Knudson was the first hometown product to play for the Rockies. During his career, Knudson posted wins over three of the four members of the 4,000 strikeout club, Nolan Ryan, Roger Clemens and Randy Johnson.

Since retiring, Knudson has worked for the Rockies in Community Relations, and began a career in sports media. He has written a syndicated newspaper column since 1994, and is also a radio and television broadcaster.

References

External links

 Mark Knudson at Baseball Biography

1960 births
Living people
American people of Norwegian descent
American expatriate baseball players in Canada
Baseball players from Denver
Colorado Rockies players
Colorado Springs Sky Sox players
Colorado State Rams baseball players
Columbus Astros players
Daytona Beach Astros players
Denver Zephyrs players
Houston Astros players
Las Vegas Stars (baseball) players
Major League Baseball pitchers
Milwaukee Brewers players
Tucson Toros players
Vancouver Canadians players